Gokal Pur also known as village gokalpur is a census town in North East district in the Indian state of Delhi. Gokal Pur village is founded by a Gurjar clan, more than 900 years ago( exact time/date is not known). There were two Jindhad Gotra (Gurjar) brothers, one is Gokal and other is Johri. Gokal establish village Gokalpur and Johri established village Johripur. The present population majorly includes  Gurjars, Pandits Rajputs  and Valmikis,. It was previously a village with cultivated land and few houses. But around 1967, the land was taken over by Land and Building department. The land than handed over to DDA (Delhi development authority). Wazirabad Road, Dr. Bhimrao Ambedkar college, MIG and LIG flats, etc are all on the land that Land and Building department acquired from the Gurjar and Rajput farmers of village gokalpur. Much to your surprise, the case against this acquisition of land (for a proper amount of acquisition and alternate land ) is still pending in court. The 4th generation of this village is still standing to fight for the case.

Demographics
 India census, Gokal Pur had a population of 90,564. Males constitute 54% of the population and females 46%. Gokal Pur has an average literacy rate of 58%, lower than the national average of 59.5%: male literacy is 63%, and female literacy is 52%. In Gokal Pur, 12% of the population is under 6 years of age.

References

Cities and towns in North East Delhi district